Dawid Woliński (born 1977 in Włocławek, Poland) is a Polish fashion designer. His clothes are worn by celebrities such as Paris Hilton, Nicole Richie, Dita von Teese, Michelle Rodriguez or Zuzanna Czerniej.

Career
Having approached fashion for the first time when still in high school, he went on to study at the Akademia Sztuk Pięknych im. Władysława Strzemińskiego in Łódź.
Woliński designed his first collection in 2003. His second collection was presented at the Lisbon Fashion Week 2005.  That collection was later featured on the covers of the German and Portugal Elle.
In 2006 Dawid Woliński signed a contract with Tracey Ross and Maxfield in Los Angeles.

Fashion shows
His last collection has been presented in Warsaw on December 15, 2011 where he presented the fall/winter 2012 collection. In the catwalk were present among the others Olga Kaczyńska and Ania Bałon - the two finalists of the second edition of the Polish Top Model. During this event there were VIPs such as Paulina Holtz, Katarzyna Nova, Natalia Lesz, Magda Gessler, Małgorzata Kożuchowska, Joanna Horodyńska, Aleksandra Woźniak, Tomasz Jacyków, etc.

Personal life
He has a daughter, Olivia, with his ex-partner Barbara.

See also
List of Poles

References

Polish fashion designers
Living people
1977 births